Playing for Keeps is the third studio album by American rock musician Eddie Money, released in July 1980, by Wolfgang Records and Columbia Records. It continues the expansion to include pop oriented tracks that began with the previous album.

The inclusion of the reggae-influenced "Running Back" as well as the syrupy duet "Let's Be Lovers Again" with Valerie Carter are indicative of the attempt to maintain rocker status and successfully migrate into the pop charts at the same time.

Several of the tracks were written in conjunction with band member Randy Nichols who toured and recorded with Money at the time.

"Get a Move On"- also featured on the soundtrack from Americathon - received AOR airplay as did "Trinidad", but the singles chosen for release didn't stir much excitement with reviewers or radio.

The album was briefly released on the CD format, but quickly withdrawn. It had not been reissued on CD until 2012 when the four first albums were remastered and re-released by a European label named Rock Candy.

Following the end of the tour supporting this album, Money experienced a collapse and subsequent hospitalization. A notable break allowing for recuperation followed.

Track listing

Personnel
Eddie Money – vocals
John Nelson – lead guitar
Jimmy Lyon – guitars, solos (tracks 1, 3, 5, 8)
David Lewark – guitars, solos (tracks 6, 9)
John Nelson – slide guitar (track 4)
Greg Douglass – guitars (track 1)
Bob Glaub – bass guitar (tracks 2, 5, 7-9)
Kenny Lewis – bass guitar (tracks 3, 4, 6)
Lonnie Turner – bass guitar (track 1)
Randy Nichols – keyboards
Robert Blass – Keyboards (tracks 2, 3, 4, 6, 8)
Gary Mallaber – drums and percussion (tracks 1, 2, 5-9)
Carmine Appice – drums (tracks 3, 4)
Emilio Castillo – horns (track 9)
Steve Kupka – horns (track 9)
Valerie Carter – vocal duet on "Let's Be Lovers Again"

Charts

References

1980 albums
Eddie Money albums
Albums produced by Ron Nevison
Columbia Records albums